Evarcha mirabilis is a jumping spider species in the genus Evarcha that was first identified in South Africa.

References

Endemic fauna of South Africa
Salticidae
Spiders of South Africa
Spiders described in 2009
Taxa named by Wanda Wesołowska